The Kothari River rises from the Aravalli hills near Devgarh in the Rajsamand district. It flows through the tehsils (districts) of Raipur, Mandal, Bhilwara and Kotri and ultimately joins the river Banas at Nandrai in Kotri tehsil. The Meja dam on the Kothari river provides drinking water to the Bhilwara district.

References

Rivers of Rajasthan
Rivers of India